TSTA may refer to:

 Taiwan Strait Tourism Association
 Texas State Teachers Association
 Tritium Systems Test Assembly